Aarambh India is a non-profit initiative working in Mumbai, India. It focuses on child protection and issues related to child sexual abuse and exploitation. The organization was established in 2012. It partners with other organizations and stakeholders and works across levels from implementing the law of Protection of Children against Sexual Offences (POCSO) on ground to training and workshops, providing care and support to the victims to child sexual abuse research, public education to advocacy.

In 2014, Aarambh India launched its website which became India’s first online resource center on child sexual abuse. In 2016, it partnered with Internet Watch Foundation to launch India’s first internet hotline to report images and videos of child sexual abuse online. On 14 November 2017, Aarambh India received the National Award for Child Welfare (Institution category) by the President of India Ram Nath Kovind, “in recognition of the valuable services to the community rendered in the field of child welfare”.

Principal Activities

The current activities of Aarambh India include:
 Training and workshops with parents, teachers, journalists, police officers, District Child Protection Units, students of social work, NGOs and other individuals and organizations to help them deal with the issue of child sexual abuse and exploitation 
 Providing legal aid and services of a social worker to help victims with judicial processes, rehabilitation and psycho-social  support
 Research on the implementation of law on Protection of Children from Sexual Offences and key areas of child sexual abuse and exploitation
 Advocacy – POCSO On The Ground initiative, a discussion series that brings up challenges of working with the law, health care and police and make recommendations towards a better framework using on-ground evidence and findings

India's first hotline to report Child Pornography

Aarambh India partnered with Internet Watch Foundation and in September 2016 launched India’s first reporting button for child sexual abuse images and videos on the internet. The national hotline for reporting child sexual abuse imagery works closely with the government, police and internet industry in India and enables citizens to report offensive content anonymously. If the content reported is found to be illegal, it is blocked, taken down irrespective of where it is hosted and the information is shared with the police for prosecution. The removed content is assigned a unique identification number ensuring that it is not uploaded in the future.

Other programs

Mumbai Children’s Safety Initiative – MCSN was started in 2013 in collaboration with Forum Against Child Sexual Abuse (FACSE) in order to help NGOs understand and provide direction on prevention and case management in slum communities. The network is led by Aarambh India and run by youth living in slum communities trained in child protection, prevention of abuse and reporting in Mumbai.

Child-Friendly Systems – Partnering with UNICEF India, Aarambh started a pilot initiative to create child-friendly systems in Mumbai in 2015. The initiative aims at ensuring that child-friendly procedures prescribed under the POCSO law are put into practice. Under the initiative, the organization works with Child Welfare Committees, government hospitals, police, District Child Protection Units (DCPUs) and local NGOs.

Over the years, Aarambh India has partnered with organizations including UNICEF, IWF, Enfold, Stairway Foundation and others to ensure maximum impact on the issue.

References

External links
 Aarambh India, official website

Child sexual abuse in India
Organizations established in 2012
2012 establishments in Maharashtra